The Central Square Historic District is a historic district encompassing the central town common of the city of Waltham, Massachusetts, and several commercial buildings facing the common or in its immediate vicinity.  The common is bounded by Carter, Moody, Main, and Elm Streets; the district includes fourteen buildings, which are located on Main, Elm, Lexington, and Church Streets, on the north and east side of the common.  The district was listed on the National Register of Historic Places in 1989.

Although Waltham was settled in the 17th century and incorporated as a town in 1738, it had no recognizable town center until the 1830s, when the nearby Boston Manufacturing Company gave the town the land that now serves as its central square. The area was further enhanced as a central location by the arrival of the railroad, and the construction of the Moody Street bridge across the Charles River, both in the 1840s. Waltham was incorporated as a city in 1884. Its City Hall, a 1924–26 Georgian Revival building designed by William Rogers Greely, stands on the common at the corner of Main and Elm Streets. The oldest municipal building in the district is the 1887 fire station at 25 Lexington Street; it is a brick Queen Anne structure designed by local architect Samuel Patch. It stands next to the 1890 police station building, designed by Hartwell & Richardson. A row of commercial buildings stand across Main Street, facing the common. Many of these were designed by architect Henry W. Hartwell, as was the Music Hall building at 15 Elm Street. Most of these buildings were built between 1880 and 1920.

Waltham Common
It is planted with mature trees, and has a network of paths as well as four major monuments. The oldest is a granite obelisk with urn designed by George F. Meacham and placed in 1867. A statue of native son, Governor of Massachusetts, and American Civil War General Nathaniel Prentice Banks, designed by Henry Hudson Kitson was placed in 1909, and a copy of "The Hiker", a memorial to veterans of the Spanish–American War, designed by Kitson's wife Theodora, was placed in the early 20th century. Lastly, a memorial celebrating the city's centennial was placed in 1984.

Transportation
Central Square is adjacent to the Waltham commuter rail station and is served by six MBTA bus lines:
 70  Cedarwood, Market Place Drive, or Central Square, Waltham - University Park
 70A North Waltham - University Park via Watertown Square and Central Square, Cambridge
 505 Central Square, Waltham - Downtown express via Massachusetts Turnpike
 553 Roberts - Downtown Boston via Central Square, Waltham, Newtonville, Newton Corner & Turnpike
 554 Waverly Square - Downtown Boston via Bentley College, Central Square, Waltham, Newtonville, Newton Corner & Turnpike
 556 Waltham Highlands - Downtown Boston via  Central Square, Waltham, Newtonville, Newton Corner & Turnpike

See also
 National Register of Historic Places listings in Waltham, Massachusetts

References

Historic districts in Middlesex County, Massachusetts
National Register of Historic Places in Waltham, Massachusetts
Waltham, Massachusetts
Historic districts on the National Register of Historic Places in Massachusetts